Brigadier Matthew [Matt] Philip Maer,  is a retired senior British Army officer. Maer commanded the 1st Battalion, Princess of Wales's Royal Regiment as a lieutenant colonel, deploying to Maysan, Iraq, in 2004 in the aftermath of the invasion of Iraq. In this role, he was awarded the Distinguished Service Order for his leadership, which included command of Victoria Cross recipient Johnson Beharry. Maer was promoted colonel on 30 June 2006, and brigadier on 30 June 2009. He was appointed a Member of the Order of the British Empire on 6 November 1998 in recognition of his "distinguished services in former Yugoslavia".

References

British Army brigadiers
British Army personnel of the Iraq War
Companions of the Distinguished Service Order
Living people
Members of the Order of the British Empire
Princess of Wales's Royal Regiment officers
Year of birth missing (living people)